Hexafluorocyclobutene is the organofluorine compound with the formula (CF2)2(CF)2.  A colorless gas, it is a precursor to a variety of compounds, including squaric acid. Hexafluorocyclobutene is prepared in two steps from chlorotrifluoroethylene.  The thermal dimerization gives 1,2-dichloro-1,2,3,3,4,4-hexafluorocyclobutane.  Dechlorination of the latter gives hexafluorocyclobutene:
C4F6Cl2  +  Zn -> C4F6  +  ZnCl2

Safety
Reminiscent of perfluoroisobutene, hexafluorocyclobutene is quite toxic with an LD = 6000 mg/min/m−3 (mice).

See also
Hexafluoro-2-butyne
Hexafluorobutadiene

References

Fluorocarbons
Cycloalkenes